Rodrigo Salinas may refer to:

 Rodrigo Salinas (footballer, born 1986), Argentine forward
 Rodrigo Salinas (footballer, born 1988), Mexican right back
 Rodrigo Salinas Muñoz, Chilean handballer
 Rodrigo Salinas (comedian), Chilean cartoonist